Volcanic Rock is the second studio album by Australian rock band Buffalo, recorded and originally released in 1973 on the Vertigo label.  

The album was remastered and reissued in September 2005 by Australian record label Aztec Music on CD with additional tracks.

Track listing
All tracks written by David John Tice and John Allan Baxter, unless noted.

 On the original LP  "Intro: Pound of Flesh"/"Shylock" is a single two-part track, it was divided into two separate tracks, "Intro: Pound of Flesh" and "Shylock", on Aztec Music CD reissue

2005 Aztec Music Reissue Bonus Tracks

Personnel
Dave Tice – lead vocals
Peter Wells – bass
John Baxter – guitar
Jimmy Economou – drums

References

Buffalo (band) albums
1973 albums
Vertigo Records albums